Wrestle Kingdom is a professional wrestling event produced annually by New Japan Pro-Wrestling (NJPW), a Japan-based professional wrestling promotion. 

 

Since 1992, NJPW has held the January 4 Tokyo Dome Show. The January 4 Tokyo Dome Show became NJPW's premier annual event and the biggest event in Japanese wrestling, similar to what WrestleMania is for WWE and American professional wrestling. It has been described as "the largest professional wrestling show in the world outside of the United States" and the "Japanese equivalent to the Super Bowl". From 1992 to 2006, the event was promoted under different names. In 2007, the event was rebranded as Wrestle Kingdom which has been the event name ever since. 

From 2007 until 2019, Wrestle Kingdom was held on January 4 on Tokyo Dome, but the show expanded to two nights in 2020. Wrestle Kingdom 14 was the first one to include matches on January 5, and further expanded to include a third night (January 8) in 2022.

Some of the earlier January 4 show attendance numbers have been disputed. The lowest attendances for a Wrestle Kingdom was for Wrestle Kingdom 15, held under attendance restrictions due to COVID-19; NJPW announced an attendance of 12,689 for the first night and 7,801 for the second. Prior to COVID-19, the Wrestle Kingdom I and Wrestle Kingdom V events drew the lowest unofficial gates, with only 18,000 in attendance.

Events

See also

List of New Japan Pro-Wrestling pay-per-view events
Professional wrestling at the Tokyo Dome

References

External links
The official New Japan website

 
Recurring events established in 1992
1992 establishments in Japan